Judo at the 1988 Summer Paralympics consisted of six events for men.

Medal summary

References 

 

1988 Summer Paralympics events
1988
Paralympics
Judo competitions in South Korea